Sergey Dmitriyevich Kutuzov (born 9 April 1999) is a Russian Greco-Roman wrestler. He won the silver medal in the 72 kg event at the 2021 World Wrestling Championships held in Oslo, Norway.

At the 2021 U23 World Wrestling Championships held in Belgrade, Serbia, he won the silver medal in the 72 kg event.

Major results

References

External links 
 

1999 births
Living people
Place of birth missing (living people)
Russian male sport wrestlers
World Wrestling Championships medalists
20th-century Russian people
21st-century Russian people